Fran Rider is a Canadian who has made a substantial impact on the growth and development of the modern game of female ice hockey and is one of the founders of the Ontario Women's Hockey Association. Rider has been both an ice hockey player and organizer for the women's category of the sport. She began playing ice hockey in 1967 with the Brampton Canadettes, the predecessor to the Brampton Thunder.

Ontario Women's Hockey Association (OWHA) 

The Ontario Women's Hockey Association was formed in 1975 by Cookie Cartwright and was formed to generate interest in women's ice hockey. About a decade later, Rider would become the association's executive director.

Organized women's ice hockey competition

Canadian
Rider set up a Canadian national championship for women's ice hockey in 1982, called the Esso Women's Hockey Nationals, which was the Canadian senior women's championship from 1982 to 2008. With the evolution of the Nationals into a professional tournament, Hockey Canada elected to discontinue it in 2008 and replace it with a national female midget championship known as the Esso Cup.

International

Rider was instrumental in helping organize the 1987 World Women's Hockey Tournament, which was hosted in Toronto, Ontario. The Ontario Women's Hockey Association hosted the tournament. However, the tournament was not recognized by the International Ice Hockey Federation (IIHF) and was therefore considered an unofficial event. During the tournament, representatives from participating nations met to establish a strategy to lobby the IIHF for the creation of a Women's World Championship.

In 1990, Rider helped organize the first IIHF-sanctioned tournament for women's ice hockey which was held in Ottawa, Ontario. The 1990 Women’s World Championships did not receive any financial support from the Canadian Amateur Hockey Association. The Canadian Amateur Hockey Association was the national governing body of amateur ice hockey in Canada from 1914 until 1994, when it merged with Hockey Canada.

Recognition for women's excellence in sport 

When Angela James was inducted into the Hockey Hall of Fame on November 8, 2010, James said that without Rider, she would never have made it into the Hockey Hall of Fame.

Rider was appointed to the Order of Canada in 2015, and in 2016, was made a member of the Order of Ontario. Along with Scotty Bowman and Murray Costello, Rider was among the 2017 class named to the Order of Hockey in Canada.

Accolades
 The Fran Rider Cup is an award named in her honor and is given to the silver medal-winning team at the annual Canadian Senior Women's National Championships.
 Rider was the first female recipient of the Canadian Amateur Hockey Association's Award of Merit.
 Awarded the Ontario Hockey Association's Minor Hockey Service Award. Rider became the first woman to claim that honour.
 Received the Ontario Hockey Association's (OHA) Gold Stick Award and became the first woman in forty five years to have the honor bestowed upon her.)
 Awarded the Ontario Ministry of Culture and Citizenship's Contribution to Sport Award
 Inducted into the Mississauga Sports Hall of Fame (2001)

Personal
During May 2018, Rider was part of a group of four female athletes, including Cassie Campbell, Jen Kish and Kerrin Lee-Gartner to publicly pledge their brain to a Canadian research centre. The posthumous donation shall be made to Toronto Western Hospital’s Canadian Concussion Centre to further research on the effect of trauma on women’s brains.

References

Canadian women's ice hockey players
IIHF Hall of Fame inductees
Living people
Members of the Order of Canada
Members of the Order of Ontario
Order of Hockey in Canada recipients
Sportspeople from Mississauga
Year of birth missing (living people)
Women ice hockey executives
Women in Ontario